Kensal Green is a railway station served by London Underground Bakerloo line and London Overground trains. It is located in College Road, London NW10 close to the junction with Harrow Road. It is about 0.5 mile (750m) route distance from the older Kensal Rise station located to the north east on the North London line, which was itself named Kensal Green until 1890. The station is in a cutting with a tunnel at the western end.

History
The station opened on 1 October 1916 on the new electrified Watford DC Line which runs parallel on the north side of the existing London and North Western Railway (LNWR) tracks from Euston to Watford.

The original station was replaced in 1980.

Bakerloo line services had been running between Queen's Park and Willesden Junction since 10 May 1915.

Since November 2007, National Rail services serving Kensal Green have been operated by London Overground Rail Operations under contract to Transport for London under the London Overground brand; the station is managed by London Underground.

The station was in the news early in 2006, as it was the last station visited by Thomas ap Rhys Pryce before he was murdered in a robbery in Kensal Green. The two main suspects had also visited the station that same night, a short time before the murder, and mugged a man on the platform. A suspect also tried to use Pryce's Oyster Card a day after the incident at the station, and was picked up on CCTV, aiding the police investigation.

This incident sparked a major public discussion on station safety and security, mainly because the station was un-staffed when the passenger was mugged. The only security present was CCTV cameras, and the ticket barriers were left open allowing the suspects to enter the station freely. 
Many high-profile politicians spoke on the issue of station safety and called on train companies to provide security or staff the station until the last train had left the station.
 
The Mayor of London at the time, Ken Livingstone, became personally involved in this, and publicly attacked Silverlink, the then operator of the station, for not providing staffing or security throughout the station's opening hours. He also stated that any company that wanted to bid for the subsidy to run the train line would have commit to staffing the station until the last train had left.
Eventually, towards the last quarter of 2006, Silverlink hired a private security firm to patrol the station, and also had speakers installed in the ticket hall to deter gangs of youths from loitering.

Connections
London Buses route 18 and night route N18 serve the station.

See also
Kensal Rise railway station
Murder of Tom ap Rhys Pryce

References

External links 

 London Transport Museum Photographic Archive

Bakerloo line stations
Tube stations in the London Borough of Brent
DfT Category E stations
Railway stations in the London Borough of Brent
Former London and North Western Railway stations
Railway stations in Great Britain opened in 1916
Railway stations served by London Overground
Kensal Green